was a  after Bun'an and before Kyotoku. This period spanned the years from July 1449 through July 1452.

Change of era
 1449 : The era name was changed to mark an event or a number of events. The previous era ended and a new one commenced in 1449 (Bun'an 6.)

The first year of Hotoku began on the 28th day of the 7th month. On the 10th day, the era name would still have been Bun'an 6.

Events of the Hōtoku era
 May 8, 1449 (Hōtoku 1, 16th day of the 4th month): Shōgun Yoshinari is honored by the emperor with the gift of a sword.
 1451 (Hōtoku 3, 7th month ): A delegation from the Ryukyu Islands arrives for the first time in Heian-kyō (Kyoto).<ref name="Titsingh346">Titsingh, ; Satow, Ernest.
 1451 (Hōtoku 3, 8th month ): Sogun Yoshihori causes a letter to be sent to the Emperor of China.

Appreciation for the waka poetry of Shōtetsu and Shinkei was noteworthy during this era.

Notes

References
 Hayashi, Shihei. (1786). . Edo: Manuscript. OCLC 44014900
 Klaproth, Julius. (1832). San kokf tsou ran to sets, ou Aperçu général des trois royaumes. Paris: Royal Asiatic Society, Oriental Translation Fund of Great Britain and Ireland. OCLC 2563166; OCLC 561284561
 Nussbaum, Louis Frédéric and Käthe Roth. (2005). Japan Encyclopedia. Cambridge: Harvard University Press. ; OCLC 48943301
 Titsingh, Isaac. (1834). Nihon Odai Ichiran''; ou,  Annales des empereurs du Japon.  Paris: Royal Asiatic Society, Oriental Translation Fund of Great Britain and Ireland.  OCLC 5850691.

External links
 National Diet Library, "The Japanese Calendar" -- historical overview plus illustrative images from library's collection

Japanese eras
1440s in Japan
1450s in Japan